The OPAL (Ostsee-Pipeline-Anbindungsleitung) is a natural gas pipeline in Germany alongside the German eastern border.  The OPAL pipeline is one of two projected pipelines connecting the Nord Stream 1 pipeline to the existing pipeline grid in Middle and Western Europe, the other one being the NEL pipeline.

Route
It connects the Nord Stream pipeline with the JAGAL (distributes gas from the Yamal-Europe pipeline), and the STEGAL (distributes gas from the Central-European Russian gas transit system (Transgas) via Czechia and Slovakia) pipelines in Germany. On the German-Czech border the pipeline is connected with the Gazela Pipeline, to connect gas export pipelines in Czechia.

Technical features
The compressor station in Radeland, Brandeburg, is built by Siemens.

The pipeline cost around €1 billion. The construction was completed in 2011 and in August 2011 Nord Stream was connected with the OPAL pipeline.

Project company
The pipeline was constructed by OPAL NEL TRANSPORT GmbH, a subsidiary of Wingas.  It is operated by OPAL Gastransport GmbH & Co KG, owned by WIGA Transport Beteiligungs-GmbH & Co. KG, a joint venture of Wintershall Dea and Gazprom.

Access by Gazprom
Polish state-run gas firm PGNiG and PGNiG Supply & Trading tried to restrict Gazprom's access to the pipeline. Oberlandesgericht Düsseldorf lifted the restrictions 

After the decision Gazprom increased the throughput to 72.5 million m3/d (26.462 billion/year).

See also

NEL pipeline
Gazela Pipeline

References

External links

 OPAL Pipeline - official Project website
 Project company website

Natural gas pipelines in Germany
Gazprom pipelines